Athletics at the 1995 Games of the Small States of Europe were held in Luxembourg City, Luxembourg between 29 May and 3 June.

Medal summary

Men

Women

Medal table

References

Games of the Small States of Europe
1995 Games of the Small States of Europe
1995
1995 Games of the Small States of Europe